Springfield Township is the name of some places in the U.S. state of Michigan:

 Springfield Township, Kalkaska County, Michigan
 Springfield Township, Oakland County, Michigan

See also 
 Springfield, Michigan, a city in Calhoun County

Michigan township disambiguation pages